The 1904 United States presidential election in Kentucky took place on November 8, 1904. All contemporary 45 states were part of the 1904 United States presidential election. Kentucky voters chose 13 electors to the Electoral College, which selected the president and vice president.

Background and vote
Ever since the Civil War, Kentucky had been shaped politically by divisions created by that war between secessionist, Democratic counties and Unionist, Republican ones, although the state as a whole leaned Democratic throughout this era and the GOP had carried the state only once – by a very narrow margin in 1896 when northern parts of the state were affected by hostility towards William Jennings Bryan, and state native John M. Palmer drew votes from the Democrats.

Kentucky was won by the Democratic nominees, Chief Judge Alton B. Parker of New York and his running mate Henry G. Davis of West Virginia. Despite Parker losing nationally in a landslide, he marginally improved on Bryan's win from 1900, although doing less well than predicted a week beforehand, when polls suggested Parker would win by 22 thousand votes or twice his actual plurality.

Results

Results by county

Notes

References

Kentucky
1904
1904 Kentucky elections